Archives of Academic Emergency Medicine is a peer-reviewed open-access medical journal covering emergency medicine. It was originally established as Emergency in 2013, changing to the current name in 2019, and is published by Shahid Beheshti University of Medical Sciences.

Abstracting and indexing
The journal is indexed and abstracted in:
CINAHL
Embase
Emerging Sources Citation Index
Islamic World Science Citation Database
Scopus (2016-2017) and (2019-present)

References

External links

Emergency website

Publications established in 2013
Emergency medicine journals
Creative Commons Attribution-licensed journals
Shahid Beheshti University
Continuous journals